In Gaussian optics, the cardinal points consist of three pairs of points located on the optical axis of a rotationally symmetric, focal, optical system. These are the focal points, the principal points, and the nodal points. For ideal systems, the basic imaging properties such as image size, location, and orientation are completely determined by the locations of the cardinal points; in fact only four points are necessary: the focal points and either the principal or nodal points.  The only ideal system that has been achieved in practice is the plane mirror, however the cardinal points are widely used to approximate the behavior of real optical systems. Cardinal points provide a way to analytically simplify a system with many components, allowing the imaging characteristics of the system to be approximately determined with simple calculations.

Explanation

The cardinal points lie on the optical axis of the optical system. Each point is defined by the effect the optical system has on rays that pass through that point, in the paraxial approximation. Aperture effects are ignored: rays that do not pass through the aperture stop of the system are not considered in the discussion below.

Focal points and planes

The front focal point of an optical system, by definition, has the property that any ray that passes through it will emerge from the system parallel to the optical axis. The rear (or back) focal point of the system has the reverse property: rays that enter the system parallel to the optical axis are focused such that they pass through the rear focal point.

The front and rear (or back) focal planes are defined as the planes, perpendicular to the optic axis, which pass through the front and rear focal points. An object infinitely far from the optical system forms an image at the rear focal plane. For objects a finite distance away, the image is formed at a different location, but rays that leave the object parallel to one another cross at the rear focal plane. 

A diaphragm or "stop" at the rear focal plane can be used to filter rays by angle, since:
It only allows rays to pass that are emitted at an angle (relative to the optical axis) that is sufficiently small. (An infinitely small aperture would only allow rays that are emitted along the optical axis to pass.) 
No matter where on the object the ray comes from, the ray will pass through the aperture as long as the angle at which it is emitted from the object is small enough.

Note that the aperture must be centered on the optical axis for this to work as indicated. Using a sufficiently small aperture in the focal plane will make the lens telecentric.

Similarly, the allowed range of angles on the output side of the lens can be filtered by putting an aperture at the front focal plane of the lens (or a lens group within the overall lens). This is important for DSLR cameras having CCD sensors. The pixels in these sensors are more sensitive to rays that hit them straight on than to those that strike at an angle. A lens that does not control the angle of incidence at the detector will produce pixel vignetting in the images.

Principal planes and points

The two principal planes have the property that a ray emerging from the lens appears to have crossed the rear principal plane at the same distance from the axis that the ray appeared to cross the front principal plane, as viewed from the front of the lens. This means that the lens can be treated as if all of the refraction happened at the principal planes, and the linear magnification from one principal plane to the other is +1. The principal planes are crucial in defining the optical properties of the system, since it is the distance of the object and image from the front and rear principal planes that determines the magnification of the system. The principal points are the points where the principal planes cross the optical axis.

If the medium surrounding the optical system has a refractive index of 1 (e.g., air or vacuum), then the distance from the principal planes to their corresponding focal points is just the focal length of the system. In the more general case, the distance to the foci is the focal length multiplied by the index of refraction of the medium.

For a thin lens in air, the principal planes both lie at the location of the lens. The point where they cross the optical axis is sometimes misleadingly called the optical centre of the lens. Note, however, that for a real lens the principal planes do not necessarily pass through the centre of the lens, and in general may not lie inside the lens at all.

Nodal points

The front and rear nodal points have the property that a ray aimed at one of them will be refracted by the lens such that it appears to have come from the other, and with the same angle with respect to the optical axis. (Angular magnification between nodal points is +1.) The nodal points therefore do for angles what the principal planes do for transverse distance. If the medium on both sides of the optical system is the same (e.g., air), then the front and rear nodal points coincide with the front and rear principal points, respectively.

The nodal points were first described by Johann Listing in 1845 to evaluate the eye, where the image is formed in fluid. Over time it was found that if a line was drawn through the posterior apex of the crystalline lens at the visual angle of a distant object, then it would point to the image location on the retina, even for very large angles. This line passes approximately through the 2nd nodal point, but rather than being an actual paraxial ray, it identifies the image formed by ray bundles that pass through the center of the pupil. This can be used to find the magnification, or to scale retinal locations. This extends the use of the nodal point for the eye, but the imaging properties come from the cornea and retina being highly curved, rather than paraxial properties, and this is rarely clear in publications. 

The nodal points are widely misunderstood in photography, where it is commonly asserted that the light rays "intersect" at "the nodal point", that the iris diaphragm of the lens is located there, and that this is the correct pivot point for panoramic photography, so as to avoid parallax error. These claims generally arise from confusion about the optics of camera lenses, as well as confusion between the nodal points and the other cardinal points of the system. (A better choice of the point about which to pivot a camera for panoramic photography can be shown to be the centre of the system's entrance pupil. On the other hand, swing-lens cameras with fixed film position rotate the lens about the rear nodal point to stabilize the image on the film.)

Surface vertices
In optics, the surface vertices are the points where each optical surface crosses the optical axis. They are important primarily because they are the physically measurable parameters for the position of the optical elements, and so the positions of the cardinal points must be known with respect to the vertices to describe the physical system.

In anatomy, the surface vertices of the eye's lens are called the anterior and posterior poles of the lens.

Modeling optical systems as mathematical transformations
In geometrical optics for each ray entering an optical system a single, unique, ray exits. In mathematical terms, the optical system performs a transformation that maps every object ray to an image ray. The object ray and its associated image ray are said to be conjugate to each other.  This term also applies to corresponding pairs of object and image points and planes. The object and image rays and points are considered to be in two distinct optical spaces, object space and image space; additional intermediate optical spaces may be used as well.

Rotationally symmetric optical systems; Optical axis, axial points, and meridional planes
An optical system is rotationally symmetric if its imaging properties are unchanged by any rotation about some axis. This (unique) axis of rotational symmetry is the optical axis of the system. Optical systems can be folded using plane mirrors; the system is still considered to be rotationally symmetric if it possesses rotational symmetry when unfolded. Any point on the optical axis (in any space) is an axial point.

Rotational symmetry greatly simplifies the analysis of optical systems, which otherwise must be analyzed in three dimensions.  Rotational symmetry allows the system to be analyzed by considering only rays confined to a single transverse plane containing the optical axis. Such a plane is called a meridional plane; it is a cross-section through the system.

Ideal, rotationally symmetric, optical imaging system
An ideal, rotationally symmetric, optical imaging system must meet three criteria:

All rays "originating" from any object point converge to a single image point (Imaging is stigmatic).
Object planes perpendicular to the optical axis are conjugate to image planes perpendicular to the axis.
The image of an object confined to a plane normal to the axis is geometrically similar to the object.

In some optical systems imaging is stigmatic for one or perhaps a few object points, but to be an ideal system imaging must be stigmatic for every object point.

Unlike rays in mathematics, optical rays extend to infinity in both directions. Rays are real when they are in the part of the optical system to which they apply, and are virtual elsewhere. For example, object rays are real on the object side of the optical system. In stigmatic imaging an object ray intersecting any specific point in object space must be conjugate to an image ray intersecting the conjugate point in image space.  A consequence is that every point on an object ray is conjugate to some point on the conjugate image ray.

Geometrical similarity implies the image is a scale model of the object.  There is no restriction on the image's orientation.  The image may be inverted or otherwise rotated with respect to the object.

Focal and afocal systems, focal points
In afocal systems an object ray parallel to the optical axis is conjugate to an image ray parallel to the optical axis.  Such systems have no focal points (hence afocal) and also lack principal and nodal points.  The system is focal if an object ray parallel to the axis is conjugate to an image ray that intersects the optical axis.  The intersection of the image ray with the optical axis is the focal point F' in image space.  Focal systems also have an axial object point F such that any ray through F is conjugate to an image ray parallel to the optical axis.  F is the object space focal point of the system.

Transformation

The transformation between object space and image space is completely defined by the cardinal points of the system, and these points can be used to map any point on the object to its conjugate image point.

See also
Film plane
Pinhole camera model
Radius of curvature (optics)
Vergence (optics)

Notes and references

 Pages 74–76 define the cardinal points.

External links
 Learn to use TEM

Geometrical optics
Geometric centers
Science of photography

de:Brennebene